Usman Wazeer (born 16 April 2000; commonly known as Usman ‘The Asian Boy’ Wazeer) is a Pakistani professional boxer who currently holds the WBO world boxing organisation youth Welterweight title. He is the first Pakistani to win the title and become a first ever World youth champion.

Early life 
Usman Tajwar was born on the 16 April 2000 in the Astore District of Gilgit-Baltistan, Pakistan. After spending his youth in Astore, Wazeer and his family shifted to Islamabad in 2009 after which he joined the Army Public School Chinar Campus in Murree. In 2015, Wazeer accidentally stumbled upon boxing while playing football in the Islamabad Sports Complex when a local boxing group motivated him to take up the sport because of his boxer like physique and looks.

Amateur career 
Usman Wazeer began his amateur boxing career in April 2015. He joined the Army Camp GHQ where Wazeer began his training with former Olympian Boxer Ahmed Ali Khan. Quickly rising through the ranks, Wazeer started competing at club level, then Islamabad level, HEC Pakistan All University level and then Provincial level. In 2017 Wazeer was selected in Pakistan’s National Amateur Boxing Team and represented the Youth National Team in Azerbaijan. During the Punjab Championships in 2018, Wazeer caught the eye of renowned boxer Amir Khan, the chief guest, who recognized his talent and offered to work with him as a professional boxer. Wazeer turned pro in 2018 and had his first professional fight in 2019. Wazeer had an amateur boxing record of 68 fights, 61 wins, 24 K.O’s and 7 losses.

Amateur boxing highlights 
 2015–2016 Islamabad Regional Gold Medalist
 2016 Quaid-e-Azam Games Bronze Medalist
 2017 HEC All Pakistan Gold Medalist
 2018 Punjab Youth Championship Gold Medalist
 2016–2018 Pakistan Youth Ranked Number 1
 Representing Pakistan in the Youth International Boxing Championship in Azerbaijan

Professional boxing career 
Wazeer began his professional boxing career in 2018 and made his debut in 2019 at welterweight.

Welterweight

Wazeer vs. Oubenais 
Wazeer made his debut against the Moroccan Brahim Oubenais (0-1-0) at the FIVE Palm Jumeirah Hotel in Dubai. Wazeer won the fight by split decision after 4 rounds claiming his first professional victory.

Wazeer vs. Tamkhuntod 
Wazeer won his second fight at the Jurado Hall of the Philippine Marine Corp after he TKO’d Visut Tamkhuntod (1-3-0) with a left body shot in the second round.

Wazeer vs. Baenkham

Wazeer vs. Simanjuntak 
In his fourth fight against Boido Simanjuntak (25-54-3) at the Amir Khan Boxing Academy, Islamabad, In the fifth round Wazeer landed a few good body shots after which he threw a right hook and left body combination to TKO Simanjuntak. This victory resulted in Wazeer becoming the first Pakistani boxer to win the Boxing Asian Boxing Federation Welter Title.

Wazeer vs. Lopez 
Wazeer’s first title defense of the ABF Welterweight Title came up against Carlos Lopez (28-10-0) at People’s Stadium Lyari, Karachi, Pakistan. After an intense few rounds between the two fighters, in the sixth round Lopez fell to the canvas after injuring his knee. Unable to carry on Wazeer won the fight by TKO and retained the ABF Welterweight Title.

In 2021, Wazeer is set to become the first Pakistani Boxer to fight for the world youth title.

Professional boxing record

References

External links 
 Boxing Record for Usman Wazeer from BoxRec
 Usman Wazeer Instagram from Instagram 

2000 births
Welterweight boxers
Living people
People from Astore District
Pakistani male boxers